The Baghdad Observer was the official Iraqi-government English-language political daily newspaper that was issued continuously between 1967 and 2003. During that period, due to the popularity of the English language worldwide and due to the official nature of that newspaper it used to be the newspaper most-cited by non-Iraqi politicians and journalists covering Iraqi issues. It also used to be one of the most influential English-language newspapers published in Iraq.

History 
The Iraqi authorities forcibly closed the Iraq Times in 1964, which at that time was the most widely circulated English-language Iraqi newspaper. In July of the same year (1964), a new newspaper, the Baghdad News, was issued in order to replace the vacuum left by the then-popular Iraq Times but with more government scrutiny. Baghdad News continued until the nationalization of the Iraqi press with the execution of the Law of the State Enterprise for Organizing Press and Printing No. 155 of 1967. With this infamous law, all the private newspapers were "cancelled" by order of the Iraqi government, including the Baghdad News. With the new law, the Public Press and Printing Enterprise was established to be the central government agency in totalitarian control of all press releases in Iraq.

Within days, Malik Dohan al-Hassan, who was the Iraqi Minister of Culture and Guidance at the fourth cabinet of Tahir Yahya, commissioned staff of the nationalized Baghdad News to use nationalized machinery of the Baghdad News and the Times Press in Baghdad to start a new government-mandated English-language newspaper to centrally replace all private English-language dailies. The new newspaper was named the "Baghdad Observer". Among the names of the founders were Khales Azmi, a former Baghdad News Editor in Chief, Kamal Butti, Edmond Sabri, Nemr Abu Shehab and Amal Afas. According to Azmi in an interview in Baghdad'd Evening newspaper a few days after the first issue of the Baghdad Observer in December 1967, the new newspaper was intended to become "the mouthpiece of the State, both locally and abroad".

The Baghdad Observer newspaper moved from the State Enterprise for Organizing Press and Printing to the House of the Masses for Journalism (Arabic: دار الجماهير للصحافة) after the issuance of the Law of the House of the Massesfor Journalism No. 98 of 1971 and then to the Al-Mamoun House for Translation and Publishing (Arabic: دار المأمون للترجمة والنشر) after the latter was established by the Ministry of Culture and Information in 1980.

The Baghdad Observer continued to be issued without interruption until one day before the Fall of Baghdad in April 2003.

Editors in Chief 

 Khales Azmi (1967-1973)
 Fuad Y.M. Qazanchi (1973-1975)
 Naji Sabri al-Hadithi (1980-1991)
 Nassera as-Sa'dun (1998-2003)

Notable Workers 

 Dunya Mikhail
 Taha al-Basry
 Zainab Ahmed
 Amal ash-Sharqi
 Ali Ibrahim ad-Dulaimi
 Nahida Rasheed at-Tamimi
 Hassan Abdel Hamid

Citations 

Newspapers published in Iraq
Mass media in Baghdad

1967 establishments in Iraq

English-language newspapers published in Arab countries
Newspapers established in 1967
Defunct newspapers published in Iraq